Juliet Lover of Idiot is a 2017 Telugu romantic comedy mystery film directed by Ajay Vodhirala, starring Naveen Chandra and Niveda Thomas in the lead roles. It is produced by Kothapalli R Raghu Babu and Kannika under Anurag Productions. Music is scored by Ratheesh Vega.

Cast 
 Naveen Chandra as Vara
 Nivetha Thomas as Julie
 Abhimanyu Singh as Khan
 Ali as Gun Laden
 Rohini as Vara's mother
 Nizhagal Ravi as Vara's father
 Supreeth as a customer at Vara's bar
 Thagubothu Ramesh as Moneylender
 Fish Venkat
 Ester Noronha as Herself, Special appearance in "I don't know "song

Music 
The songs and background music was scored by Ratheesh Vega under Mango Music. The audio was released on 29 October 2017.

Release 
A critic from The Times of India gave the film a rating of one-and-a-half out of five stars and noted that "Despite having a stupendous cast, ‘Juliet Lover of Idiot’ seems to have missed the mark". A critic from The Hindu opined that the film was "inconsistent and incoherent".

References

External links

Indian romantic drama films
2010s Telugu-language films
2017 romantic drama films